Andouillette is a French coarse-grained sausage made from the intestine of pork, pepper, wine, onions, and seasonings.

True andouillettes are rarely seen outside France and have a strong, distinctive odour coming from the colon. Although sometimes repellent to the uninitiated, the scent is prized by its devotees.

Ingredients and history 
The original composition of "andouillette sausages" is not known and there is no record of the andouillette's composition from earlier than the nineteenth century. Nineteenth century dictionaries simply describe them as "small andouilles" (petites andouilles).

During recent decades, a range of differently composed andouillettes are or have been offered by charcuterie producers: the principal differences concern the primary ingredients used, whether pork or veal or a mixture of the two. During the twenty-first century the incorporation of veal, historically the more costly meat ingredient, has been banned in response to concerns over BSE. Some French regions such as Cambrésis (the area surrounding Cambrai) and Lyonnais were still including veal right up to the ban. In other regions, pork has been the only meat in an andouillette for more than a century:  that is the case with the andouillette "of Troyes", which is currently the type of andouillette most likely to be encountered in national outlets, such as supermarkets, throughout France. But it seems likely that through the nineteenth and twentieth centuries, local producers were using their own unique recipes according to time and place:  the recipes used by local specialised outlets continue to vary considerably.

A number of andouillettes sold as local specialities have nevertheless evolved or indeed disappeared, such as the andouillettes of Villers-Cotterêts which received a mention in the posthumously published Culinary Dictionary (Grand Dictionnaire de cuisine) by Alexandre Dumas.

In his 2021 memoir Taste: My Life Through Food, actor Stanley Tucci wrote humorously about ordering an andouillette with Meryl Streep in a small French restaurant.  Neither could stomach the dish.

Serving 
Andouillettes can be served either hot or cold, with the former much more common. As with all lower intestine sausages, andouillettes are to some extent an acquired taste. Their smell may offend people unaccustomed to the dish. The texture is somewhat rougher than most sausages, as the content is coarsely cut. Primarily pan-fried (sometimes breaded), it can also be boiled, barbecued or grilled. The sausage is often served with vegetables (primarily onions) in a mustard or red wine sauce.

Popularity 
It is a common dish all over France but some regions are well known for their own recipes. The most famous ones come from Troyes, Lyon, Cambrai and Chablis and are graded using the AAAAA (5 As) grading system.

Clubs
The Association Amicale des Amateurs d'Andouillette Authentique (AAAAA) 'The Friendly Club of Lovers of Authentic Andouillette' is a club formed by several food writers in 1970. It gives certificates ("diplôme") to producers of high-quality andouillettes.

See also
Lyonnaise cuisine
List of sausages

References

External links

Association Amicale des Amateurs d'Andouillette(s) Authentique(s) Official website  
Association Amicale des Amateurs d'Andouillette Authentique French Wikipedia 

French sausages
Offal